Pietro Papetti (born 4 October 1999) is an Italian ice dancer who currently competes with Leia Dozzi. With his former skating partner, Chiara Calderone, he is the 2019 Egna Dance Trophy silver medalist and 2018 Open d'Andorra bronze medalist. Earlier in their career, Calderone/Papetti won the Italian national junior title and placed 13th at the 2018 World Junior Championships.

Programs

With Calderone

With Mühlmeyer

With Righi

Competitive highlights 
CS: Challenger Series; JGP: Junior Grand Prix

With Dozzi

With Calderone

With Mühlmeyer

With Righi

References

External links 
 

1999 births
Figure skaters at the 2016 Winter Youth Olympics
Italian male ice dancers
Living people
Sportspeople from Bergamo
Competitors at the 2019 Winter Universiade
Competitors at the 2023 Winter World University Games